The kolpos (Greek κόλπος, breast) is the blousing of a peplos, chiton or tunic in Ancient Greek clothing, whereby excess length of the material hangs folded over a zone (a narrow girdle).

The fabric of the garment was typically cut longer than the shoulder-to-floor measurement of the women or man wearing it. The excess length was dealt with at the waist (creating the kolpos) and optionally the top edge (creating the apoptygma). To create the kolpos, a zone was tied around the body below the breast (high-girdled) or at the waist (low-girdled) and excess fabric was pulled up over it. The fabric fell over the girdle so as to hide it, and was often pulled longer in back than in front. This fold was the kolpos. A second (visible) zone could be tied over the kolpos to redefine the waist, high or low. This might be hidden again by the apoptygma, the loose, folded down top of the peplos.

See also 
 Clothing in ancient Greece

References 

Greek clothing
History of clothing